Feet on the Ground is the seventh studio album by the Filipino musical trio APO Hiking Society, released in 1984 through Universal Records. The album's cover artwork features an homage to the Beatles album Abbey Road, featuring the band walking across a pedestrian crossing.

Track listing
Hitting the Big Time (4:39)
Goodtime (4:15)
Oh My Love (3:48)
Yes This Is the Right (4:06)
Brothers, Sisters, Mothers, Fathers (4:23)
Anna (3:16)
A New Thing in My Life (3:27)
I'm the Real Thing (4:17)
Love Is Not Enough (2:38)
Come to Me (3:23)
Prisoner's Lament (4:13)

References

APO Hiking Society albums
1984 albums